The lunar south pole is the southernmost point on the Moon, at 90°S. It is of special interest to scientists because of the occurrence of water ice in permanently shadowed areas around it. The lunar south pole region features craters that are unique in that the near-constant sunlight does not reach their interior. Such craters are cold traps that contain a fossil record of hydrogen, water ice, and other volatiles dating from the early Solar System. In contrast, the lunar north pole region exhibits a much lower quantity of similarly sheltered craters.

Geography

The lunar south pole is located on the center of the polar Antarctic Circle (80°S to 90°S). The lunar south pole has shifted 5 degrees from its original position billions of years ago. This shift has changed the rotational axis of the Moon, allowing sunlight to reach previously shadowed areas, but the south pole still features some completely shadowed areas. The axis spin is 88.5 degrees from the plane of the elliptic. On the contrary, the pole also contains areas with permanent exposure to sunlight. The south pole region features many craters and basins such as the South Pole–Aitken basin, which appears to be one of the most fundamental features of the Moon, and mountains, such as Epsilon Peak at 9.050 km, taller than any mountain found on Earth.

Craters
The rotational axis of the Moon lies within Shackleton Crater. Notable craters nearest to the lunar south pole include De Gerlache, Sverdrup, Shoemaker, Faustini, Haworth, Nobile, and Cabeus.

Discoveries

Illumination

The lunar south pole features a region with crater rims exposed to near constant solar illumination, yet the interior of the craters are permanently shaded from  sunlight. The area's illumination was studied using high resolution digital models produced from data by the Lunar Reconnaissance Orbiter. The lunar surface can also reflect solar wind as energetic neutral atoms. On average, 16% of these atoms have been protons that varies based on location. These atoms have created an integral flux of backscattered hydrogen atoms due to the reflected amount of plasma that exists on the surface of the Moon. They also reveal the line boundary and the magnetic dynamics within the regions of these neutral atoms on the Moon' surface.

Cold traps

Cold traps are some of the important places on the lunar south pole region in terms of possible water ice and other volatile deposits. Cold traps can contain water and ice that were originally from comets, meteorites and solar wind-induced iron reduction. From experiments and sample readings, scientists were able to confirm that cold traps do contain ice. Hydroxyl has also been found in these cold traps. The discovery of these two compounds has led to the funding of missions focusing primarily on the lunar poles using global scale infrared detection. The ice stays in these traps because of the thermal behavior of the Moon that are controlled by thermophysical properties such as scattered sunlight, thermal re-radiation, internal heat and light given off by the Earth.

Magnetic surface

There are areas of the Moon where the crust is magnetized. This is known as a   magnetic anomaly due to the remnants of metal iron that was emplaced by the impactor that formed the South Pole–Aitken basin (SPA basin). However, the concentration of iron that is thought to be in the basin was not present in the mappings, as they could be too deep in the Moon's crust for the mappings to detect. Or the magnetic anomaly is caused by another factor that does not involve metallic properties. The findings were proven inadequate due to the inconsistencies between the maps that were used, and also, they were not able to detect the magnitude of the magnetic fluctuations at the Moon's surface.

Exploration

Missions

Orbiters from several countries have explored the region around the lunar south pole. Extensive studies were conducted by the Lunar Orbiters, Clementine, Lunar Prospector, Lunar Reconnaissance Orbiter, Kaguya, and Chandrayaan-1, that discovered the presence of lunar water. NASA's LCROSS mission found a significant amount of water in Cabeus. NASA's LCROSS mission deliberately crashed into the floor of Cabeus and from samples found that it contained nearly 5% water.

The Lunar Reconnaissance Orbiter (LRO) was launched on 18 June 2009 and is still mapping the lunar south pole region. This mission will help scientists see if the lunar south pole region has enough sustainable resources to sustain a permanent crewed station. The LRO carries the Diviner Lunar Radiometer Experiment, which is investigating the radiation and thermophysical properties of the south pole surface. It can detect reflected solar radiation and internal infrared emissions. The LRO Diviner is able to detect where water ice could be trapped on the surface.

The Moon Impact Probe (MIP) developed by the Indian Space Research Organisation (ISRO), India's national space agency, was a lunar probe that was released by ISRO's Chandrayaan-1 lunar remote sensing orbiter which in turn was launched, on 22 October 2008. The Moon Impact Probe separated from the Moon-orbiting Chandrayaan-1 on 14 November 2008, 20:06 IST and after nearly 25 minutes crashed as planned, near the rim of Shackleton Crater. With this mission India became the first to hard land or impact on  Lunar South pole. 

India's second lunar mission Chandrayaan-2, which was launched on 22 July 2019, attempted to soft-land on the south polar region of the Moon between 70.90267°S  22.78110°E and 67.87406°S  18.46947°W. The lander failed to land safely, losing communication barely 335m from the ground.

Role in the future exploration and observations
The lunar south pole region is deemed as a compelling spot for future exploration missions and suitable for a lunar outpost. The permanently shadowed places on the Moon could contain ice and other minerals, which would be vital resources for future explorers. The mountain peaks near the pole are illuminated for large periods of time and could be used to provide solar energy to an outpost. With an outpost on the Moon scientists will be able to analyze water and other volatile samples dating back to the formation of the Solar System.

Scientists used LOLA (Lunar Orbiter Laser Altimeter), which was a device used by NASA to provide an accurate topographic model of the Moon. With this data locations near the south pole at Connecting Ridge, which connects Shackleton Crater to the de Gerlache crater, were found that yielded sunlight for 92.27–95.65% of the time based on altitude ranging from 2 m above ground to 10 m above ground. At the same spots it was discovered that the longest continuous periods of darkness were only 3 to 5 days.

The lunar south pole is a place where scientists may be able to perform unique astronomical observations of radio waves under 30 MHz. The Chinese Longjiang microsatellites were launched in May 2018 to orbit the Moon, and Longjiang-2 operated in this frequency until 31 July 2019. Before Longjiang-2, no space observatory had been able to observe astronomical radio waves in this frequency because interference waves from equipment on Earth. Though facing Earth the lunar south pole has mountains and basins, like the south side of Malapert Mountain that are not facing Earth and would be an ideal place to receive such astronomical radio signals from a ground radio observatory.

Resources

Solar power, oxygen, and metals are abundant resources on the south polar region. By locating a lunar resource processing facility near the south pole, solar-generated electrical power will allow for nearly constant operation. Elements known to be present on the lunar surface include, among others, hydrogen (H), oxygen (O), silicon (Si), iron (Fe), magnesium (Mg), calcium (Ca), aluminium (Al), manganese (Mn) and titanium (Ti). Among the more abundant are oxygen, iron and silicon. The oxygen content is estimated at 45% (by weight).

Future

Blue Origin is planning a mission to the south polar region in about 2024. The Blue Moon lander derives from the vertical landing technology used in Blue Origin's New Shepard sub-orbital rocket. This would lead to a series of missions landing equipment for a crewed base in a south polar region crater using their Blue Moon lander.

NASA's Artemis program has proposed to land several robotic landers and rovers (CLPS) in preparation for the 2025 Artemis 3 crewed landing at the south polar region.

Following Chandrayaan-2, where a last-minute glitch in the soft landing guidance software led to the failure of the lander's soft landing attempt after a successful orbital insertion, another lunar mission for demonstrating soft landing was proposed. Chandrayaan-3 will be a mission repeat of Chandrayaan-2 but will only include a lander and rover similar to that of Chandrayaan-2. It will not have an orbiter. The spacecraft is planned to be launched in the third quarter of 2022.Chandrayaan-3 is likely to be launched in July of 2023

See also
Colonization of the Moon polar regions
Face on Moon South Pole
Geology of the Moon
Lunar north pole
Lunar resources
Selenography

References

External links
USGS Astrogeology Science Center: Moon

South Pole